The Mummy is a 1959 British horror film, directed by Terence Fisher and starring Peter Cushing and Christopher Lee. It was written by Jimmy Sangster and produced by Michael Carreras and Anthony Nelson Keys for Hammer Film Productions. The film was distributed in the U.S. in 1959 on a double bill with either the Vincent Price film The Bat or the Universal film Curse of the Undead.

Though the title suggests Universal Pictures' 1932 film of the same name, the film actually derives its plot and characters entirely from two 1940s Universal films, The Mummy's Hand and The Mummy's Tomb, with the climax borrowed directly from The Mummy's Ghost. The character name Joseph Whemple, the use of a sacred scroll, and a few minor plot elements are the only connections with the 1932 version.

Plot 
In Egypt in 1895, archaeologists John Banning, his father Stephen and his uncle Joseph Whemple are searching for the tomb of Princess Ananka, the high priestess of the god Karnak. John has a broken leg and cannot accompany his father and uncle when they open the tomb. Before they enter, an Egyptian named Mehemet Bey warns them not to go in, lest they face the fatal curse against desecrators. Stephen and Joseph ignore him, and discover within the sarcophagus of Ananka. After Joseph leaves to tell John the good news, Stephen finds the Scroll of Life and reads from it. Outside, members of the archaeological team hear his screams and rush into the tomb to find Stephen in a catatonic state.

Three years later, back in England, Stephen Banning comes out of his catatonia at the Engerfield Nursing Home for the Mentally Disordered, and sends for his son. He tells him that when he read from the Scroll of Life, he unintentionally brought back to life Kharis, the mummified high priest of Karnak. The high priest had been sentenced to be entombed alive to serve as the guardian of Princess Ananka's tomb: Kharis secretly loved the princess and attempted to restore her to life after she died; when he was discovered, eternal life and mummification were his punishment. Now, Stephen tells his disbelieving son that Kharis will hunt down and kill all those who desecrated Ananka's tomb.

Meanwhile, Mehemet Bey, a devoted worshiper of Karnak, comes to Engerfield under the alias of Mehemet Atkil to wreak vengeance on the Bannings. He hires a pair of drunken carters, Pat and Mike, to bring the slumbering Kharis in a crate to his rented home, but the two men's drunken driving cause Kharis's crate to fall off and sink into a bog. Later, using the Scroll of Life, Mehemet exhorts Kharis to rise from the mud, then sends him to murder Stephen Banning. When Kharis kills Joseph Whemple the next night, John witnesses it. He shoots Kharis with a revolver at close range, but to no effect.

Police Inspector Mulrooney is assigned to solve the murders but, because he is skeptical and deals only in "cold, hard facts", he does not believe John's incredible story about a killer mummy, even when John tells him that he is likely to be Kharis' third victim. While Mulrooney investigates, John notices that his wife Isobel bears an uncanny resemblance to Princess Ananka. Gathering testimonial evidence from other individuals in the community, Mulrooney slowly begins to wonder if the mummy is real.

Mehemet Bey sends the mummy to the Bannings' home to slay his final victim. However, when Isobel rushes to her husband's aid, Kharis sees her, releases John, and leaves. Mehemet Bey mistakenly believes that Kharis has completed his task, and prepares to return to Egypt. John, suspecting Mehemet Bey of being the one controlling the mummy, pays him a visit, much to Bey's surprise.

After John leaves, Mehemet Bey leads Kharis in a second attempt on John's life. The mummy knocks Mulrooney unconscious, while Mehemet Bey deals with another policeman guarding the house. Kharis finds John in his study and starts to choke him. Alerted by John's shouts, Isobel runs to the house without Mulrooney; at first, the mummy does not recognize her, but John tells her to loosen her hair and the mummy releases John. When Mehemet orders Kharis to kill Isobel, he refuses; Mehemet tries to murder Isobel himself, but is killed by Kharis instead. The mummy carries the unconscious Isobel into the swamp, followed by John, Mulrooney and other policemen. John yells to Isobel; when she regains consciousness, she tells Kharis to put her down. The mummy reluctantly obeys. When Isobel has moved away from him, the policemen open fire, causing Kharis to sink into a quagmire, taking the Scroll of Life with him.

Cast 
 Peter Cushing as John Banning
 Christopher Lee as Kharis / The Mummy
 Yvonne Furneaux as Isobel Banning / Princess Ananka
 Eddie Byrne as Inspector Mulrooney
 Felix Aylmer as Stephen Banning
 Raymond Huntley as Joseph Whemple
 George Pastell as Mehemet Bey
 Michael Ripper as Poacher
 George Woodbridge as P. C. Blake
 Harold Goodwin as Pat
 Denis Shaw as Mike
 Gerald Lawson as Irish Customer
 Willoughby Gray as Dr. Reilly
 John Stuart as Coroner
 David Browning as Police Sergeant
 Frank Sieman as Bill
 Stanley Meadows as Attendant
 Frank Singuineau as Head Porter

Production

Filming occurred at Bray Studios in Berkshire. Originally the scenes of Kharis's tongue being cut out and shotgun demise were more graphic, but were trimmed for the British censor.

In the video, Flesh and Blood: The Hammer Heritage of Horror, Peter Cushing says he suggested the scene in which he drives a spear through the mummy. He was inspired by the pre-release poster (see image above) which shows the mummy with a shaft of light passing through it.

A fibreglass replica of a sarcophagus created for the film is in the collection of the Perth Museum and Art Gallery.

Critical reception 
The Monthly Film Bulletin of the UK wrote: "More glamorously photographed than ever, Hammer's latest excursion into nineteenth century macabre fantasy is weighed down by wordy historical exposition, flashbacks to ancient Egyptian burial ceremonies and a resultant slackening in pace". Howard Thompson of The New York Times thought that the film was "woodenly directed" and "should have been better". Variety wrote that the film was "excellently executed" in all technical departments, and while there was "little of actual newness" to the plot, the film "carries the type of action expected, and while chiller aspects aren't too pronounced they're sufficient to those who want to find them". Harrison's Reports called it "a fairly good picture of its kind, produced on a more lavish scale than its predecessors and enhanced by Technicolor photography".

The Hammer Story: The Authorised History of Hammer Films wrote of the film: "Structurally little more than a string of picturesque and nice-lit killings, The Mummy's melancholic presentation and romantic undertow grants it a certain atmosphere which elevates this bandaged brute far beyond its cinematic predecessors".
It currently holds a positive 89% "Fresh" on film review aggregate website Rotten Tomatoes based on 9 reviews.

Nina Wilcox Putnam, co-writer of the original 1932 Universal Mummy film, was highly critical of the Hammer adaption, writing in a letter to Time magazine: "This disgusting English remake was done without my knowledge or consent, and it has been a terrible shocking at the age of 75, to find such a work attributed to me, however wrongly and by indirection".

In other media 
The film was adapted into a 12-page comic strip for the July 1978 issue (#22) of the magazine Hammer's Halls of Horror. It was drawn by David Jackson from a script by Steve Moore. The cover of the issue featured a painting by Brian Lewis of Christopher Lee as Kharis.

The film is cited as a particular influence on the Doctor Who serial Pyramids of Mars (1975).

References

Bibliography

External links

 
 
 
 

1959 films
1959 horror films
1950s English-language films
1950s historical fantasy films
1950s historical horror films
Ancient Egypt in fiction
British historical fantasy films
British historical horror films
Films about curses
Films adapted into comics
Films directed by Terence Fisher
Films set in 1895
Films set in 1898
Films shot at Bray Studios
Films with screenplays by Jimmy Sangster
Gothic horror films
Hammer Film Productions horror films
Mummy films
Reboot films
Universal Pictures films
1950s British films